BTEC may refer to:
Begumgonj Textile Engineering College, a college in Bangladesh
Biomass Thermal Energy Council, a US advocacy organization
Business and Technology Education Council, a British body, now part of Edexcel, which awards vocational qualifications (which are themselves still known as BTECs)
BTEC Level 2
BTEC Level 3
Golden LEAF Biomanufacturing Training and Education Center, a training center at North Carolina State University